On 11 February 2023, Brianna Ghey, a 16-year-old British transgender girl from Birchwood in Warrington, Cheshire, England, was killed in Culcheth Linear Park in Culcheth, Warrington. Two accused teenagers, a boy and a girl both aged 15, are in police custody, having been charged with murder four days after the incident. A motive has not been established and police are investigating "all lines of inquiry", including investigating the killing as a possible hate crime.

Background 

Ghey was a 16-year-old transgender girl and a Year 11 pupil at Birchwood Community High School. Her parents described her as "a larger-than-life character who would leave a lasting impression on all that met her". According to her friends, Ghey would often help younger trans girls safely and legally access hormone replacement therapy. They also said she had faced years of transphobic harassment and bullying before she was killed, including at school, a part of which was being repeatedly "gang beaten". 

In addition to being a student, Ghey was also a TikToker under the username @gingerpuppyx, with her number of followers variously reported as 11,000, 31,000 and 63,000. On TikTok she was known for miming and dancing to popular songs. One of her final TikToks said that she was "excluded from school". After her death, her TikTok account was deleted.

Killing
On the afternoon of 11 February 2023, Ghey was found with multiple stab wounds on a path in Culcheth Linear Park by members of the public. Emergency services were called at 3:13p.m. and she was pronounced dead at the scene. A Home Office postmortem has been ordered to determine the cause of death. On 15 February 2023, prosecutor Leanne Gallagher said the attack on Ghey was "extremely brutal and punishing".

On 8 March 2023, an inquest into Ghey's death was opened at Warrington Coroner's Court, and subsequently adjourned until after the trial. A pre-inquest hearing is scheduled for 17 August 2023.

Aftermath 

A TikTok memorial account and a GoFundMe page were set up by Ghey's friends to support her family. It raised £70,000 in three days, and amassed over 36,000 followers on TikTok. Candlelight vigils were held across the United Kingdom, and in Dublin, Ireland in the week after Ghey's death. The attendance for many of these vigils numbered in the hundreds to thousands. A Cheshire Police Investigating Officer said Ghey's family were overwhelmed by "the messages of support, positivity and the compassion across the country and beyond".

On 13 February, a no-fly zone was instituted over the site of the killing in response to flights by drones. Despite the no-fly zone, people continued to fly drones over the site, prompting condemnation from police.

The LGBTQ-themed radio station, Gaydio, announced it had collaborated with other LGBTQ stations in the UK to broadcast a minute's silence at 11:00 a.m. on 17 February. The silence would be preceded by a feature introduced by transgender presenter Stephanie Hirst in which she would reflect on the discrimination and violence often experienced by trans people, as well as paying tribute to Ghey.

Due to the Gender Recognition Act 2004 that prevents minors from acquiring a gender recognition certificate, Ghey's death certificate will likely misgender her. U.S. civil rights attorney Alejandra Caraballo wrote "The gender recognition act that the gender criticals keep fighting, with horrific, demonising language, means that Brianna Ghey's death certificate cannot list her gender as female. As a final insult, the English government will officially misgender her in death." Twitter campaigns called for the Government to issue a Gender Recognition Certificate to Ghey "so that she can have the dignity in death that everyone else in this world takes for granted".

Accused 
Two 15-year-old suspects, a boy from Leigh and a girl from Warrington, were arrested by Cheshire Police on the evening of 12 February 2023. Police described the killing as a "targeted attack", and on 14 February, the police began to investigate the attack as a possible hate crime, after having previously stated that there was no evidence to suggest that it was. On 15 February the suspects were charged with murder, refused bail, placed in youth detention, and ordered to appear at Liverpool Crown Court the next morning.

On 16 February 2023, the suspects appeared, via video link, in a brief hearing at Liverpool Crown Court. At this hearing, Judge David Aubrey remanded the suspects in youth detention accommodation until a pre-trial preparation hearing on 2 May 2023, in which they will enter their pleas. He also tentatively set their trial to start on 10 July 2023. It is predicted that the trial will last for approximately three weeks.

Reactions 
Ghey's death prompted responses from her family, local community, politicians, charities, activists, and musicians. Ghey's family said her death had "left a massive hole in our family". Emma Mills, headteacher of Birchwood Community High School said: "We are shocked and truly devastated to hear of the death of Brianna." A parent of one of Ghey's friends, speaking with the Daily Mail, alleged that the killing was a hate crime. Police initially stated that they had no evidence supporting the claim that this was a hate crime, but since have opened an investigation as to whether or not the killing may be a hate crime. 

Labour Party MP Dawn Butler said on Twitter that "Anyone in the media who is using her deadname trying to erase Brianna's identity should be ashamed of themselves." Another Labour Party MP Nadia Whittome said: "Brianna deserved a chance to become a beautiful adult woman, and to live to see a world where trans people are safe and respected." Former Labour Party leader Jeremy Corbyn responded by saying "she was killed because she wanted to be herself", and adding "My thoughts are with Brianna's family and the trans community fighting for safety, dignity and liberation".

The Miami Herald reported that thousands in the LGBTQ community and users of social media were grieving over the stabbing death of Ghey. LGBTQ rights charity Stonewall and transgender youth charity Mermaids expressed sympathy for Ghey's family. Transgender community helplines reported large increases in calls soon after Ghey's death, with topics concerning "transphobia, gender identity and hate crimes". Various musicians tweeted their sorrow, disgust and support, including Yungblud, Big Joanie and Reverend and the Makers.

Criticism of UK media

Some UK media outlets were criticised for their reporting of Ghey's death. The Trans Safety Network said that some UK media outlets were "publicly disrespecting" Ghey in their coverage of her death. Initial reporting by both BBC News and Sky News did not state that Ghey was transgender. The Times faced strong criticism after amending their original story by removing the word "girl" and including Ghey's deadname. The Times later amended their story again to remove the deadname and re-add the word "girl".

The website The Mary Sue condemned what it described as the transphobic atmosphere of the British press and widespread transphobic reporting on the killing of Ghey. Senthorun Raj, a professor of human rights law, said "We all have a responsibility to challenge the insidious ways the media and politicians dehumanise trans people." Ash Sarkar, a journalist for Novara Media, said she "cannot fathom the callousness involved in making the editorial decision to violate her dignity in death." Labour MP for Warrington North Charlotte Nichols said that she would be lodging a complaint with The Times and the Independent Press Standards Organisation and that "there is absolutely no need whatsoever for anyone to publish her deadname when identifying her as trans in media coverage."

A report by NBC News on the killing concluded that "the climate in the U.K. has grown increasingly hostile for trans people over the last few years", noting that the BBC had recently published the article "We're being pressured into sex by some trans women", which was accused of "[painting] all transgender women as sexual predators". American magazine Vogue connected the killing to online transphobia, writing that "there's a near-constant questioning of trans rights that reinforces the idea that trans men and women are trying to fool us, to trick us, that their deeply personal gender identity is an affront to the status quo and how we live."

See also 
 History of violence against LGBT people in the United Kingdom
 Violence against LGBT people
 Violence against trans women
 Violence against transgender people

References 

2023 in England
2020s in Cheshire
Crime in Cheshire
Stabbing attacks in England
February 2023 crimes in Europe
February 2023 events in the United Kingdom
LGBT-related controversies in the United Kingdom
Stabbing attacks in 2023
Violence against LGBT people in the United Kingdom
Violence against trans women
Violence against children in England